Carola Prosperi (12 October 1883 – 26 March 1981) was an Italian writer, feminist and journalist.

Biography
Prosperi was born in Turin in 1883 where she worked as a teacher in the Niccolò Tommaseo school. Prosperi also wrote for the magazines Lidel, La Donna and the newspaper La Stampa. She was a prolific writer beginning in 1899 with a series of fairy tales and then working on short stories and novels. Though her novels began with the theme of isolated middle class woman she also wrote for children. She wrote approximately 2,800 short stories and more than 35 novels. Although she herself did not consider herself a feminist writer, modern scholars do see her this way. Prosperi died in Turin in 1981.

Bibliography

Short stories

 La profezia e altre novelle, Torino, Lattes, 1907
 Il cuore in gioco, Milano, Società Editoriale Italiana, 1913
 Vocazioni, Milano, Treves, 1919
 Amore...amore, Firenze, Battistelli, 1920
 Dimenticare, Firenze, Battistelli, 1920
 I lillà sono fioriti, Milano, Treves, 1921
 Tormenti, Firenze, Battistelli, 1921
 La felicità in gabbia, Milano, Mondadori, 1922
 Stagione al mare, Cremona, Edizioni Librarie Italiane, 1944

Novels

 La paura d'amare, Torino, Lattes, 1911
 La nemica dei sogni, Milano, Treves, 1914
 L'estranea, Milano, Treves, 1915
 La casa meravigliosa, Firenze, Battistelli, 1920
 Il fanciullo feroce, Milano, Treves, 1921
 L'amore di un'altra, Torino, Agle, 1922
 Una storia appena cominciata, Firenze, Le Monnier, 1923
 Vergine madre, Milano-Verona, Mondadori, 1924
 Il pianto di Lilian, Milano-Verona, Mondadori, 1931
 Tempesta intorno a Lyda, Milano-Verona, Mondadori, 1931
 Agnese, amante ingenua, Milano, Rizzoli, 1934
 Il secondo amore, Milano, Rizzoli, 1934
 Amanti nel labirinto, Milano, Rizzoli, 1937
 Domani ci ameremo, Milano, Rizzoli, 1938
 Rose bianche, Milano, Rizzoli, 1938
 L'altro sogno, Milano-Roma, Rizzoli, 1939
 L'indifesa, Milano-Verona, Mondadori, 1940
 La maschera d'amore, Milano, Rizzoli, 1941
 Incomprensibile cuore, Milano, Rizzoli, 1942
 La donna forte, Milano, Rizzoli, 1942
 La sua sconosciuta, Milano, Rizzoli, 1942
 Graziella, Milano, Rizzoli, 1943
 Ho guardato nel tuo cuore, Milano, Sonzogno, 1943
 Qualcuno ti attende, Milano, Rizzoli, 1944
 Il cuore ascolta, Milano, Rizzoli, 1945
 La colpa segreta, Milano, Rizzoli, 1947
 La signorina Chiara, Milano-Roma, Rizzoli, 1947
 Per un altro amore, Milano, Rizzoli, 1947
 L'amore sbaglia, Milano, Rizzoli, 1948
 Le due suore, Torino, Sas, 1950
 Eva contro Eva, Torino, Sas, 1951
 Fiamme bugiarde, Milano, Rizzoli, 1951
 Angeli senza cielo, Torino, Sas, 1952
 La freccia spezzata, Torino, Sas, 1952
 Un marito per Patrizia, Milano, Rizzoli, 1953
 L'angelo della televisione, Milano, Rizzoli, 1956
 Buona fortuna, Natalia!, Alba (Cuneo), Edizioni Paoline, 1967
 Storia di Selvaggia, Alba, Edizioni Paoline, 1969

Sources

External links 
 

1883 births
1981 deaths
Writers from Turin
20th-century Italian women writers
20th-century Italian journalists
Italian women journalists